Shakir Ali Noorie (also written as Muhammad Shākīr ´Alī Nūrī) is an Indian Sunni Muslim scholar, preacher and current President of Sunni Dawate Islami, a non-political, religious organisation in Mumbai, India. He has been ranked among the top 500 Muslims in The 500 Most Influential Muslims published by Royal Islamic Strategic Studies Centre.

Life and career
Noorie says that he was born in Junagadh, Gujarat in India.

Noorie has been ranked among The 500 Most Influential Muslims by Royal Islamic Strategic Studies Centre since 2013, with the omission of 2018.

Sunni Dawate Islami 
Sunni Dawate Islami (SDI) is a non-political and religious organisation in Mumbai [Bombay], India. It holds an annual conference [Ijtema] in Mumbai, which is said to be attended by between 150,000 and 300,000 people; the first day (Friday) is reserved for women. Followers of Sunni Dawate Islami wear white turbans.

In 2008, SDI had a European headquarters at Noor Hall in Preston, England, and centres in some other English towns, including: Blackburn, Bolton, Leicester and Manchester.  SDI also had a North American headquarters in Chicago. By 2008, SDI had founded 12 madrasas in India.  In 2020, SDI says that in India it manages 50 madrasas and 15 schools that teach in English.< ref name=ClaimedBiography/> SDI says it has an educational centre in Bolton (England), and an educational centre in Mauritius.

Literary works
His works include:
 Ahlussunnah Beliefs and Practices, Idarah Ma'arif-e-islami, (2016) 
Modesty in Islam, Idarah Ma'arif-e-islami, (2016) 
Marital Life of Prophet, Idarah Ma'arif-e-islami, (2019) 
Noorie Aurad o Wazaif
Muzda e Bakshish (collections of naats).
 Barkat e Shariat
Maah-e-Ramadan Kaise Guzarein (English: How to spend the month of Ramadan)
The Wisdom of Namaaz
 Guldasta-e-Siratun Nabi (English: A bouquet of Siratun Nabi) 
 Azmat Maah-e-Muharram aur Imam Hussain (English: The glory of the month of Muharram and Imam Hussain).

See also 
 Sayyed Aminul Qadri

References

Living people
People from Junagadh
Urdu-language writers from India
Barelvis
1960 births